Dodekablennos fraseri is a species of combtooth blenny found in the western Indian Ocean, around Réunion and Mauritius. This species is the only known member of its genus. Its specific name honours Thomas H. Fraser of the Mote Marine Laboratory who collected the type.

References

Salarinae
Taxa named by Victor G. Springer
Fish described in 1978